Niger competed at the 2020 Summer Olympics in Tokyo. Originally scheduled to take place from 24 July to 9 August 2020, the Games were postponed to 23 July to 8 August 2021, because of the COVID-19 pandemic. It was the nation's thirteenth appearance at the Summer Olympics. Since the nation made its debut in 1964, Nigerien athletes have participated in every edition of the Summer Olympic Games, except for two occasions, the 1976 Summer Olympics in Montreal, and the 1980 Summer Olympics in Moscow because of the African and the US-led boycotts, respectively.

Competitors
The following is the list of number of competitors in the Games.

Athletics

Nigerien athletes achieved the entry standards, either by qualifying time or by world ranking, in the following track and field events (up to a maximum of 3 athletes in each event):

Track & road events

Judo
 
Niger qualified one judoka for the men's half-lightweight category (66 kg) at the Games. Ismael Alhassane accepted a continental berth from Africa as the nation's top-ranked judoka outside of direct qualifying position in the IJF World Ranking List of June 28, 2021.

Swimming

Niger received a universality invitation from FINA to send two top-ranked swimmers (one per gender) in their respective individual events to the Olympics, based on the FINA Points System of June 28, 2021.

Taekwondo

Niger entered two athletes into the taekwondo competition at the Games. Rio 2016 silver medalist and 2017 world champion Abdoul Razak Issoufou qualified directly for the second time in the men's heavyweight category (+80 kg) by finishing among the top five taekwondo practitioners at the end of the WT Olympic Rankings. Meanwhile, Tekiath Ben Yessouf secured the remaining spot on the Nigerien squad with a top two finish in the women's lightweight category (57 kg) at the 2020 African Qualification Tournament in Rabat, Morocco.

References

Nations at the 2020 Summer Olympics
2020
2021 in Nigerien sport